This is the list of cathedrals in Serbia sorted by denomination.

Eastern Orthodox
Cathedrals of the Serbian Orthodox Church:
 Cathedral of Assumption of the Theotokos in Kragujevac (Eparchy of Šumadija)
 Cathedral of the Most Holy Trinity in Kraljevo (Eparchy of Žiča)
 Cathedral of the Most Holy Trinity in Niš (Eparchy of Niš)
 Cathedral of the Most Holy Trinity in Vranje (Eparchy of Vranje)
 Cathedral of Nativity of the Theotokos in Zaječar (Eparchy of Timok)
 Cathedral of Resurrection of Christ in Valjevo (Eparchy of Valjevo)
 Cathedral of Saint Apostles Peter and Paul in Šabac (Eparchy of Šabac)
 Cathedral of Saint Archangel Michael in Belgrade (Archbishopric of Belgrade and Karlovci)
 Cathedral of Saint Archangels Michael and Gabriel in Požarevac (Eparchy of Braničevo)
 Cathedral of Saint Basil of Ostrog in Prijepolje (Eparchy of Mileševa)
 Cathedral of Saint George in Novi Sad (Eparchy of Bačka)
 Cathedral of Saint George in Kruševac (Eparchy of Kruševac)
 Cathedral of Saint George in Prizren (Eparchy of Raška and Prizren, Kosovo)
 Cathedral of Saint Nicholas in Vršac (Eparchy of Banat)
 Cathedral of Translation of Relics of Saint Nicholas in Sremski Karlovci (Eparchy of Srem)

Cathedral of the Romanian Orthodox Church:
 Cathedral of Ascension of Christ in Vršac (Eparchy of Dacia Felix)

Roman Catholic
Cathedrals of the Roman Catholic Church in Serbia:
 Cathedral Basilica of Saint Demetrius in Sremska Mitrovica (Diocese of Srijem)
 Cathedral Basilica of Saint Theresa of Avila in Subotica (Diocese of Subotica)
 Cathedral of Assumption of Blessed Virgin Mary in Belgrade (Archdiocese of Belgrade)
 Cathedral of Our Lady of Perpetual Succour in Prizren (Diocese of Prizren-Priština, Kosovo)
 Cathedral of Saint John of Nepomuk in Zrenjanin (Diocese of Zrenjanin)
 Cathedral of Saint Mother Teresa in Priština (Diocese of Prizren-Priština, Kosovo)
 Co-Cathedral of Christ the King in Belgrade (Archdiocese of Belgrade)

Cathedral of the Greek Catholic Church in Serbia:
 Cathedral of Translation of Relics of Saint Nicholas in Ruski Krstur (Greek Catholic Eparchy of Ruski Krstur)

See also
List of cathedrals

References

Cathedrals in Serbia
Serbia
Cathedrals
Cathedrals